In zoology, the hypostome can refer to structures in distinct animal groups:

Hypostome (trilobite), the ventral mouthpart plate in trilobites
Hypostome (tick), the barbed attachment structure associated with the mouthparts of parasitic arachnids
Hypostome (cnidarian), the oral tip surrounded by tentacles in hydrozoan cnidarians